Michael LeMoyne Kennedy (February 27, 1958 – December 31, 1997) was an American lawyer, businessman, and activist in Massachusetts. He was the sixth of eleven children to Robert F. Kennedy and Ethel Skakel. Kennedy also served as the head of the non-profit organization Citizens Energy. He died in Aspen, Colorado, in 1997 after skiing into a tree.

Early life
Michael LeMoyne Kennedy was born on February 27, 1958, in Washington, D.C. He was named after an Irish priest and a long-standing family friend, Michael Kennedy of Dungarvan in County Waterford, and Kirk LeMoyne Billings, the prep school roommate of his paternal uncle, John F. Kennedy, and a close Kennedy family friend. He was five years old when his uncle was assassinated and ten years old when his father was assassinated.

Education and career
He graduated with a B.S. degree from Harvard College in 1980 and subsequently earned his Juris Doctor from the University of Virginia School of Law in 1984.

After law school, Kennedy worked briefly for a private law firm in Boston.

Kennedy was the head of his brother Joe's non-profit organization, Citizens Energy Corporation, which provides heating oil and services to elderly and low-income households in Massachusetts and other cold-weather states.

Kennedy co-chaired the Walden Woods Project, a non-profit organization to preserve Walden Pond in Concord, Massachusetts. In 1994, he co-founded Stop Handgun Violence, a group that raises public awareness about handguns. That same year, he helped organize his uncle Ted Kennedy's successful re-election campaign for the U.S. Senate against Republican Mitt Romney, later a governor of Massachusetts and United States Senator from Utah.

Personal life
Kennedy married Victoria Denise Gifford, daughter of former pro football player and sportscaster Frank Gifford and Maxine Avis Ewart, on March 14, 1981, in New York City.

They had one son, Michael LeMoyne Kennedy Jr. (born January 9, 1983), and two daughters, Kyle Francis Kennedy (born July 1984) and Rory Gifford Kennedy (born November 14, 1987). The family resided in Cohasset, Massachusetts, until his death in December 1997. His son Michael Jr. and his wife, Mary Campbell, had one son, Michael LeMoyne Kennedy III, in 2014 and a daughter, Quinn Elizabeth Kennedy, in 2016. Kyle and her husband Liam Kerr were married on August 18, 2012, and had sons Conor Kennedy Kerr (2014) and Declan Francis Kerr (2016). A daughter, Conor's twin sister, Josephine Ethel Kerr, died in infancy in 2014. His youngest daughter, Rory, married David DiCamillo on September 30, 2016. They welcomed their first child, Jack Kennedy DiCamillo, on September 20, 2018.

In 1997, the news broke that Kennedy was having an affair with the family's underage former babysitter. Allegations were reported that the affair had begun three years earlier, when the babysitter was 14 years old. Kennedy took and passed three polygraph tests conducted by companies employed and directed by the Kennedy family, claiming he had not had sex with the Cohasset teen until she was 16, the legal age of consent in Massachusetts at the time. Kennedy was placed under investigation for statutory rape.  Shortly after the scandal surfaced, Kennedy and his wife separated.

Death

Kennedy died on December 31, 1997, in a skiing accident in Aspen Mountain, Colorado. He was playing football while on skis with several other members of the Kennedy family when, at approximately 4:15 p.m., he hit a tree. Kennedy was not wearing a helmet or other safety equipment. The family had been admonished by the ski patrol to cease the activity. Following the accident, Kennedy was taken to Aspen Valley Hospital, where he was pronounced dead at 5:50 p.m.

He was interred on January 3, 1998, in the family plot at Holyhood Cemetery in Brookline, Massachusetts.

See also
Kennedy family
Kennedy curse
List of skiing deaths

References

External links

1958 births
1997 deaths
Harvard College alumni
American people of Irish descent
Michael LeMoyne
Lawyers from Washington, D.C.
Massachusetts lawyers
Robert F. Kennedy
Skiing deaths
University of Virginia School of Law alumni
Sports deaths in Colorado
American Roman Catholics
American people of Dutch descent
Burials at Holyhood Cemetery (Brookline)